Dastgerd (also known as Dasht-e Khvord, Dasht-i-Khurd, and Dastjerd) is a village in Dehdasht-e Sharqi Rural District, in the Central District of Kohgiluyeh County, Kohgiluyeh and Boyer-Ahmad Province, Iran. At the 2006 census, its population was 473, in 85 families.

References 

Populated places in Kohgiluyeh County